Grzegorz Motyka (born 1967) is a Polish historian and author specializing in the history of Poland–Ukraine relations. Since 1992 he served at the Institute of Political Studies of the Polish Academy of Sciences and at the Institute of National Remembrance.

Motyka graduated from the history department at the John Paul II Catholic University of Lublin in 1992. Motyka was awarded the postgraduate academic degree of Doctor of Philosophy in 1998. The title of his dissertation was Walki polsko-ukraińskie na ziemiach dzisiejszej Polski w latach 1943–1948 (the Polish-Ukrainian war on the territory of present day Poland in 1943–48). Motyka habilitated his degree in 2007.

After 1992 he became a researcher in the Polish Academy of Sciences. He also worked at the Public Education Office of the Institute of National Remembrance (until 2007). He worked as adjunct at the Faculty of Ukrainian Studies in the Jagiellonian University, but also as Associate professor of the Pułtusk Academy of Humanities. In 2011 he was selected by the Senate of Poland – the upper house of the Polish parliament – to the Board of Directors of IPN. In 2017 he received the title of professor.

Selected works
 Pany i rezuny. Współpraca AK-WiN i UPA 1945–1947, Warszawa 1997 (with Rafał Wnuk)
 Tak było w Bieszczadach. Walki polsko-ukraińskie w Polsce 1943–1948, Warszawa 1998
 Antypolska Akcja OUN-UPA 1943–1944. Fakty i interpretacje, ed. Grzegorz Motyka, Dariusz Libionka, IPN 2002
 Służby Bezpieczeństwa Polski i Czechosłowacji wobec Ukraińców 1945–1989, Warszawa 2005 (ed. and coauthor)
 Ukraińska partyzantka 1942–1960, Warszawa 2006
 "W kręgu "Łun w Bieszczadach", Warszawa 2009
 Od rzezi wołyńskiej do akcji "Wisła". Konflikt polsko-ukraiński 1943–1947 Wydawnictwo Literackie, 2011. . 
 Na Białych Polaków obława. Wojska NKWD w walce z polskim podziemiem 1944–1953, Wydawnictwo Literackie, Kraków 2014, .

References

1967 births
Living people
20th-century Polish historians
Polish male non-fiction writers
Academic staff of Jagiellonian University
People associated with the Institute of National Remembrance
John Paul II Catholic University of Lublin alumni
21st-century Polish historians